John Henry Ketcham (December 21, 1832 – November 4, 1906) was a United States representative from New York for over 33 years. He also served as a general in the Union Army during the American Civil War.

Biography
John H. Ketcham was born in Dover Plains, New York on December 21, 1832. He pursued an academic course and graduated from Suffield Academy at Suffield, Connecticut. He then became interested in agricultural pursuits, as well as politics. He was Supervisor of the Town of Dover in 1854 and 1855; a member of the New York State Assembly (Dutchess County, 1st District) in 1856 and 1857; and a member of the New York State Senate (11th District) in 1860 and 1861.

With the outbreak of the American Civil War, he enlisted in the Union Army and was appointed as colonel of the 150th New York Volunteer Infantry, on October 11, 1862. Ketcham was brevetted as a brigadier general on December 6, 1864, and promoted to the full rank of brigadier general in the volunteer army on April 1, 1865. He was brevetted major general of Volunteers March 13, 1865.

Following the war, Ketcham resumed his political career. He was elected as a Republican to the Thirty-ninth and to the three succeeding Congresses (March 4, 1865 – March 3, 1873). He was the chairman of the Committee on Public Lands Forty-second Congress. He was an unsuccessful candidate for reelection in 1872 to the Forty-third Congress.

Ketcham was a Commissioner of the District of Columbia from July 3, 1874, until June 30, 1877, when he resigned. During this time, he was a delegate to the Republican National Convention in 1876. He was subsequently elected as a Republican to the Forty-fifth and to the seven succeeding Congresses (March 4, 1877 – March 3, 1893). He served as chairman of the Committee on Expenditures in the Department of State (Fifty-seventh through Fifty-ninth Congresses). Ketcham declined to be a candidate for renomination.

He re-entered politics and became a delegate to the 1896 Republican National Convention and was then elected as a Republican to the Fifty-fifth and to the four succeeding Congresses and served from March 4, 1897, until his death in New York City on November 4, 1906. John Ketcham is buried in Valley View Cemetery in Dover Plains, New York.

John H. Ketcham Elementary School in Washington, DC is named for him.

See also

List of American Civil War generals (Union)
List of United States Congress members who died in office (1900–49)

References

External links

John Henry Ketcham, late a representative from New York, Memorial addresses delivered in the House of Representatives and Senate frontispiece 1907

1832 births
1906 deaths
Republican Party New York (state) state senators
Republican Party members of the New York State Assembly
Union Army generals
People of New York (state) in the American Civil War
Members of the Board of Commissioners for the District of Columbia
Republican Party members of the United States House of Representatives from New York (state)
People from Dover, New York
19th-century American politicians
People from Dover Plains, New York